Alberto Chillon (born 5 December 1990) is an Italian rugby union player who plays as a scrum-half.  He currently plays for Rovigo Delta after the experience with Valorugby Emilia in the Top10.

In 2021 Chillon was named as Permit Player for Benetton Treviso. From 2012 to 2015, he played for Zebre.

In May 2013, Chillon was called up by the Italian national rugby union team for the South African Quadrangular Tournament. On 22 June, he made his debut against Scotland coming on as a substitute.

References

External links
Alberto Chillon Statistics
Alberto Chillon International Statistics

1990 births
Living people
Italian rugby union players
Italy international rugby union players
Benetton Rugby players
Petrarca Rugby players
Zebre Parma players
Rugby union scrum-halves